Pierre le Beau (born 8 March 1986) is a German former professional footballer who played as a right-back.

References

External links
 

1986 births
Living people
German footballers
Association football fullbacks
2. Bundesliga players
3. Liga players
Regionalliga players
FC Erzgebirge Aue players
Chemnitzer FC players
ZFC Meuselwitz players